Donato Barbaro was responsible for the Venetian victory over the Paleologo in 1259.

13th-century Venetian people
Donato